John Quested may refer to:

 John Quested (RAF officer) (1893–1948), English World War I flying ace
 John Quested (producer) (born 1935), British film producer